State Road 172 (NM 172) is a  state highway in the US state of New Mexico. NM 172's southern terminus is at NM 249 north of Maljamar, and the northern terminus is at U.S. Route 380 (US 380) east of Roswell.

Major intersections

See also

References

172
Transportation in Chaves County, New Mexico